Mariana Naydenova (born 11 February 1962) is a Bulgarian basketball player. She competed in the women's tournament at the 1988 Summer Olympics.

References

1962 births
Living people
Bulgarian women's basketball players
Olympic basketball players of Bulgaria
Basketball players at the 1988 Summer Olympics
Sportspeople from Pernik